Jealousy is a 1934 American drama film directed by Roy William Neill and starring Nancy Carroll, George Murphy, Donald Cook and Raymond Walburn. The film was released on November 23, 1934 by Columbia Pictures.

Plot summary
An insanely jealous boxer murders his manager when he finds him alone with his fiancee, but she is the one charged with the crime by the police.

Cast 
 Nancy Carroll as Josephine 'Jo' Douglas O'Roarke
 George Murphy as Larry O'Roarke
 Donald Cook as Mark Lambert
 Raymond Walburn as Phil
 Arthur Hohl as Mike Callahan
 Inez Courtney as Penny
 Robert Allen as Jim Rainey
 Clara Blandick as Mrs. Douglas
 Arthur Hoyt as Mr. Smith
 Josephine Whittell as Laura

References

External links 

1934 films
1934 drama films
American drama films
Columbia Pictures films
Films directed by Roy William Neill
American black-and-white films
Films with screenplays by Kubec Glasmon
1930s English-language films
1930s American films